Sorzano is a municipality of the autonomous community of La Rioja (Spain). It is located near the capital Logroño and has a population of 263 inhabitants as of January 2006. Sorzano also has 10.23 km extension.

History 
In the testament of queen Doña Estefanía, widow of king García Sanchez III of Navarre (from Nájera), leaves to her son Don Sancho, with Viguera and other villages, like Soricano.

In 1070 the kings of Pamplona Don Sancho and Doña Placencia gave to the monastery of Saints Cosme and Damián the part of the tithes of his belonging in Viguera, Hornos, Entedigone (Entrena), and half mill of Solarana (Sorzano). All these villages are near Logroño.

Sorzano was village of Nalda until 1632.

Monuments 

 St. Martin's Church.
 Hermedaña's Hermitage. 
 Monument to Don Juan Calvo Estefanía.

References

Municipalities in La Rioja (Spain)